Marcia Fernanda Daniel (born 30 September 1977 in Portsmouth, Dominica) she is a retired athlete who competed for Dominica.

She competed at the 2000 Summer Olympic Games in the women's 400 metres, she finished 7th in her first round so failed to advance.

References

Living people
1977 births
Dominica female sprinters
Olympic athletes of Dominica
Athletes (track and field) at the 2000 Summer Olympics
Commonwealth Games competitors for Dominica
Athletes (track and field) at the 1995 Pan American Games
Athletes (track and field) at the 1998 Commonwealth Games
People from Saint John Parish, Dominica
Pan American Games competitors for Dominica